Gonzalo Ariel Gómez (born 23 February 1998) is an Argentine professional footballer who plays as a forward for Arsenal de Sarandí.

Career
Gómez's senior career began with Arsenal de Sarandí. He was an unused substitute during the 2017–18 Argentine Primera División season for games with Vélez Sarsfield and Chacarita Juniors, prior to making his professional debut during a 1–1 draw with Patronato on 9 April 2018. Three further appearances followed as Arsenal were relegated to Primera B Nacional.

Career statistics
.

References

External links

1998 births
Living people
Footballers from Rosario, Santa Fe
Argentine footballers
Association football forwards
Argentine Primera División players
Primera Nacional players
Arsenal de Sarandí footballers